Andorra was represented by four athletes at the 2012 European Athletics Championships in Finland. They all finished in the last position of their events.

Results

Men

Track

Women

Track

Field

References
Official website

Nations at the 2012 European Athletics Championships
2012
European Athletics Championships